Danylo Mykolayovych Dmytriyev (born 22 October 2002) is a Ukrainian professional footballer who plays as a left winger for Ukrainian club Mariupol.

References

External links
 
 

2002 births
Living people
Place of birth missing (living people)
Ukrainian footballers
Association football forwards
FC Mariupol players
FC Yarud Mariupol players
Ukrainian Premier League players
Ukrainian First League players
Ukrainian Second League players